Starlord was a short-lived weekly British science fiction comic book magazine published by IPC in 1978 as a sister title to 2000 AD, which had been launched the previous year in anticipation of a science fiction boom surrounding Star Wars.

Starlord was planned as a fortnightly title for older readers, with longer stories and higher production values than 2000 AD and the rest of the IPC boys' comics stable, but this proved too ambitious. Episodes were shortened, the number of colour pages was reduced, although the better quality paper and printing were retained, and Starlord was published weekly at a higher cover price than 2000 AD.

Stories
Stories included:

 Strontium Dog, a series about a mutant bounty hunter created by writer John Wagner and artist Carlos Ezquerra.
 Ro-Busters, a robot disaster squad created by writer Pat Mills and artist Kevin O'Neill, although it was more usually drawn by Carlos Pino or Dave Gibbons.
 Mind Wars, a series about two psychic teenagers in the middle of a galactic war, written by Alan Hebden and drawn by Jesus Redondo (concluded in #22, but briefly returned for a sequel in the 1981 Starlord Annual)
 Timequake, featuring a tramp steamer skipper reluctantly recruited into Time Control, an agency which fought to prevent anyone tampering with time.
 Planet of the Damned, a passenger jet vanishes in the Bermuda Triangle and the passengers find themselves on a hostile alien world. Written by Pat Mills (as RE Wright).
 Holocaust, Carl Hunter, a private detective, discovers a government cover-up of an alien invasion. Written by Alan Hebden.

Publications
As well as 22 regular issues, there were also three Annuals dated 1980–1982 (each published at the end of the previous year) and one Summer Special in 1978.

Merger
IPC found that publishing two science fiction titles split the market. Starlord was actually the better selling of the two titles, and normal policy was to end the poorer-performing title and merge it into the more popular comic. However, group editor John Sanders preferred 2000 AD and so he decided to end Starlord instead. Starlord was cancelled after 22 issues and merged with 2000 AD in issue 86 of that title. Its last issue was dated 7 October 1978. Sales of 2000 AD steadily increased.

2000 AD's line-up was strengthened by the merger: Strontium Dog became one of its most popular and long-running series; and Ro-Busters continued on in 2000 AD for a while and led to an enduring spin-off, ABC Warriors, which still features today. Timequake also briefly featured in issues 148 to 151. By that time the title Starlord had been dropped from the cover of 2000 AD with issue 127 in August 1979.

Collected editions
Two series, those that carried on into 2000 AD, have been collected by Rebellion Developments into trade paperbacks:

Strontium Dog Search/Destroy Agency Case Files: File 01 (336 pages, January 2007)
The Complete Ro-Busters (336 pages, November 2008)

The series Mind Wars was reprinted in the supplements to issues 408 and 409 of the Judge Dredd Megazine in 2019. The episode in the Annual was reprinted in the supplement to #411.

Editor
Starlord was edited by Kelvin Gosnell, who was also editor of 2000 AD, although he mostly concentrated on Starlord and left 2000 AD to assistant editor Nick Landau. After Starlord merged with 2000 AD, Gosnell became editor of new comic Tornado.

Like 2000 AD, Tornado and Scream!, Starlord had a fictional editor, a bouffant-haired superhero also called Starlord, and each issue was supposed to be a primer for survival in the galaxy. When the title was cancelled and merged with 2000 AD, Starlord announced that his mission on Earth had been successfully completed and he was off to battle the evil Interstellar Federation on other worlds, though he urged his readers to "keep watching the stars" (his catchphrase). When a 2000 AD reader asked after Starlord's whereabouts in a 1999 issue though, 2000 AD editor Tharg claimed that "While Starlord has not been sighted on Earth since 1979, rumours that he was seen in a McDonalds in Basingstoke cannot be entirely discounted". On another occasion, it was claimed that he was "out in the Rakkalian Cluster, singing lead soprano with an Alvin Stardust tribute band". Heralding the 40th anniversary of the comic, and satirising the flurry of revelations regarding 1970s children's entertainers, it was suggested in a satirical story that Starlord was in fact a warmongerer who brainwashed children to become child soldiers and had been imprisoned as a war criminal for the past four decades.

Story index

Regular issues

Planet of the Damned
Issues: 1–10
Episodes: 10
Pages: 49
Script: Pat Mills
Art: Lalia 1; Pena 2, 5, 6, 8, 10; Azpiri 3, 4, 7, 9
Cover dates: 13 May 1978 to 15 July 1978

Timequake
First story
Issues: 1–3
Episodes: 3
Pages: 18
Script: Jack Adrian
Art: Ian Kennedy 1, 3; John Cooper 2
Dated: 13 May 1978 to 27 May 1978

Second story
Issues: 4–9
Episodes: 6
Pages: 36
Script: Jack Adrian
Art: Magellanes Salinas
Dated: 3/6/78 to 8/7/78

Third story
Issues: 10–13
Episodes: 4
Pages: 28
Script: Ian Mennell
Art: Magellanes Salinas
Dated: 15 July 1978 to 5 August 1978

Strontium Dog
Max Quirxx
Issues: 1–2
Episodes: 2
Pages: 10
Script: John Wagner
Art: Carlos Ezquerra
Dated: 13 May 1978 to 20 May 1978

Papa Por-ka
Issues: 3–5
Episodes: 3
Pages: 15
Script: John Wagner
Art: Carlos Ezquerra
Dated: 27 May 1978 to 10 June 1978

No Cure For Kansyr
Issues: 6–7
Episodes: 2
Pages: 10
Script: John Wagner
Art: Carlos Ezquerra
Dated: 17 June 1978 to 24 June 1978

Planet of the Dead
Issues: 8–10
Episodes: 3
Pages: 15
Script: John Wagner
Art: Carlos Ezquerra
Dated: 1 July 1978 to 15 July 1978

Two-Faced Terror!
Issues: 12–15
Episodes: 4
Pages: 23
Script: John Wagner
Art: Carlos Ezquerra
Dated: 29 July 1978 to 19 August 1978

Demon Maker
Issues: 17–19
Episodes: 3
Pages: 15
Script: John Wagner
Art: Brendan McCarthy 1; Ian Gibson 2–3
Dated: 2 September 1978 to 16 September 1978

The Ultimate Weapon
Issues: 21–22
Episodes: 2
Pages: 10
Script: John Wagner
Art: Carlos Ezquerra
Dated: 30 September 1978 to 7 October 78

Ro-Busters
First story
Issue: 1
Episodes: 1
Pages: 11
Script: Pat Mills
Art: Carlos Pino
Dated: 13 May 1978

Second story
Issues: 2–4
Episodes: 3
Pages: 18
Script: Pat Mills
Art: Carlos Pino
Dated: 20 May 1978 to 3 March 1978

Third story
Issues: 5–6
Episodes: 2
Pages: 10
Script: Bill Henry
Art: Ian Kennedy
Dated: 10 June 1978 to 17 June 1978

Fourth story
Issues: 7–12
Episodes: 6
Pages: 38
Script: Pat Mills
Art: Carlos Pino
Dated: 24 June 1978 to 29 July 1978

Fifth story
Issues: 13–14
Episodes: 2
Pages: 14
Script: V. Gross
Art: Ian Kennedy
Dated: 5/8/78 to 12/8/78

Sixth story
Issues: 15–19
Episodes: 5
Pages: 34
Script: Jack Adrian
Art: Carlos Pino 1, 3, 5; Ferrer 2, 4
Dated: 19 August 1978 to 16 September 1978

Seventh story
Issues: 20–22
Episodes: 3
Pages: 23
Script: Jack Adrian
Art: Ferrer 1, 3; Carlos Pino 2
Dated: 23 September 1978 to 7 October 1978

Mind Wars
Issues: 2–22
Episodes: 21
Pages: 129
Script: Alan Hebden
Art: Jesus Redondo 1–19, 21(with Ian Gibson in episode 11);Mike White 20
Dated: 20 May 1978 to 7 October 1978

Good Morning, Sheldon, I Love You!
Issue: 11
Episodes: 1
Pages: 6
Script: John Wagner
Art: Casanovas
Dated: 22 July 1978

Holocaust
Issues: 14–22
Episodes: 9
Pages: 69
Script: Alan Hebden
Art: Lalia 1–4; unknown artist 5, 8–9;
Madigllianes 6; Luis 7
Dated: 12/8/78 to 7/10/78

Earn Big Money While You Sleep!
Issue: 16
Episodes: 1
Pages: 6
Script: Alan Grant and John Wagner
Art: Casanovas
Dated: 26 August 1978

The Snatch
Issue: 17
Episodes: 1
Pages: 3
Script: Alan Hebden
Art: Pena
Dated: 2/9/78

Skirmish!
Issue: 20
Episodes: 1
Pages: 5
Script: Alan Hebden
Art: Pena
Dated: 23 September 1978

Summer special

Timequake
Pages: 9
Script: Patterson
Art: John Cooper

Ro-Busters
Pages: 10
Script: V. Gross
Art: G. Campion

Trash
Pages: 7
Script: D. Hooper
Art: Magano

Strontium Dog
Pages: 10
Script: Bill Henry
Art: Brendan McCarthy

Neutron Tide
Text story by Arthur C. Clarke
(Reprinted from Galaxy Science Fiction, May 1970)

Notes

References

Bishop, David (2007) Thrill-Power Overload: The Official History of 2000AD (Rebellion Developments, June 2007)
Starlord at Barney 

Comics magazines published in the United Kingdom
Fleetway and IPC Comics titles
Defunct British comics
Science fiction comics
1978 comics debuts
Magazines established in 1978
Magazines disestablished in 1978
1978 comics endings